Tetragonoderus toamasinae is a species of beetle in the family Carabidae. It was described by Alluaud in 1896.

References

Beetles described in 1896
toamasinae